Walter Wirth Lake (aka Lake Wirth) is a lake in Salem, Oregon, United States.  Walter Wirth Lake is wholly contained within Cascades Gateway Park.  The park and lake began development in 1957 with the Salem Area Chamber of Commerce working with the State Highway Department to convert a gravel burrow pit into a park.  Original development of the park included a swimming area, paddle boats, a children's zoo, and concession stands. In 1976, a Department of Environmental Quality study determined the lake to be suffering the effects from upstream polluters closing the lake to swimming. Since that time the lake has held numerous programs in canoeing, sailing, and fishing, it is now open for swimming again.

See also
 List of lakes in Oregon

References

External links
 City of Salem Walter Wirth Lake
 2008 Oregon Department of Fish & Wildlife Stocking Schedule

Geography of Salem, Oregon
Lakes of Marion County, Oregon
Lakes of Oregon
Tourist attractions in Salem, Oregon